"Kalla nätter" is the debut single by Swedish singer Jessica Andersson. The song was written by Tim Larsson, Johan Fransson, Tobias Lundgren and Niklas Edberger. It was selected as one of the competing songs in Melodifestivalen 2006, a song competition to represent Sweden at the Eurovision Song Contest. The song came fifth in the third semi-final on 4 March 2006, and was eliminated from the competition.

The single was released two days later, peaking at number six on the Swedish Singles Chart in May.

Track listing
CD single
 "Kalla Nätter"  (Original Version)  - 3:02
 "Kalla Nätter"  (Singback Version)  - 3:02

Charts

Release history

References 

2005 songs
2006 debut singles
Jessica Andersson songs
Melodifestivalen songs of 2006
Songs written by Tim Larsson
Songs written by Tobias Lundgren
Songs written by Niklas Edberger
Songs written by Johan Fransson (songwriter)